Ecyrus dasycerus is a species of beetle in the family Cerambycidae. It was described by Say in 1827.

Subspecies
 Ecyrus dasycerus dasycerus (Say, 1827)
 Ecyrus dasycerus floridanus Linsley, 1935

References

Pogonocherini
Beetles described in 1827